Mary Ann Elizabeth Heacock (1915-2011), commonly known as Mary Ann Heacock, was an avocational botanist who collected plants and inspired the work of many horticulturists and plant societies.

She was born on 11 June 1915 in Marthaville, Louisiana, USA, and died on 23 July 2011 in Waurika, Oklahoma.

Some of the plant species and cultivars Heacock had a special role in identifying or developing include:

 Pinus ponderosa 'Mary Ann Heacock', a dwarf pine
 Opuntia debreczyi, a prickly pear
 Penstemon grandiflorus 'P010S', Prairie Jewel® penstemon

References

1915 births
American women botanists
American botanists
2011 deaths
21st-century American women